Susanne Beyer (née Helm, born 24 June 1961) is a retired East German high jumper. She won a bronze medal at the 1987 World Championships.

Biography
Born Susanne Helm in Suhl, she finished seventh at the 1983 World Championships and fourth at the 1986 European Championships. She began the 1987 season well with a win at the Hochsprung mit Musik meeting, taking the title with a leap of 2.00 m. She maintained her form indoors and won the silver medal at the 1987 World Indoor Championships with a lifetime best of 2.02 metres. Her season peaked with a bronze medal at the 1987 World Championships, scoring a lifetime outdoor best of 1.99 metres. At the European Indoor Championships she won the silver in 1985 and a bronze in 1987.

She represented the sports team SC Dynamo Berlin and became East German champion in 1983, 1985 and 1987.

Her outdoor personal best jump of 1.99 metres ranks her eighth among German high jumpers, behind Ariane Friedrich (2.06), Heike Henkel (2.05), Ulrike Meyfarth (2.03), Heike Balck (2.01), Alina Astafei (2.01), Rosemarie Ackermann (2.00) and Daniela Rath (2.00) and joint with Kerstin Brandt. Her indoor best of 2.02 m, ranks her fourth on the German all-time indoor list, behind Henkel (2.07), Friedrich (2.05) and Astafei (2.04).

International competitions

See also
Female two metres club

References

External links

1961 births
Living people
East German female high jumpers
World Athletics Championships medalists
World Athletics Championships athletes for East Germany
World Athletics Indoor Championships medalists
Competitors at the 1986 Goodwill Games
People from Suhl
Sportspeople from Thuringia